The Best of Niemen is a compilation of Czesław Niemen's greatest hits released between 1966 and 1969.

Track listing 
 "Pod papugami" - 3:15 (music Mateusz Święcicki, lyrics Bogusław Choiński, Jan Gałkowski)
 "Wspomnienie" - 3:50 (music Marek Sart, lyrics Julian Tuwim)
 "Baw się w ciuciubabkę" - 3:05 (music Czesław Niemen, lyrics Jacek Grań)
 "Płonąca stodoła" - 2:30 (music Czesław Niemen, lyrics Marta Bellan)
 "Sen o Warszawie" - 3:20 (music Czesław Niemen, lyrics Marek Gaszyński)
 "Czy wiesz" - 2:30 (music Czesław Niemen, lyrics Marek Gaszyński)
 "Spiżowy krzyk" - 2:15 (music Czesław Niemen, lyrics Czesław Niemczuk)
 "Nie wiem czy warto" - 4:15 (music Zbigniew Bizoń, lyrics Krzysztof Dzikowski)
 "Przyjdź w taką noc" - 2:15 (music Mateusz Święcicki, lyrics Krzysztof Dzikowski)
 "Włóczęga" - 2:30 (traditional with lyrics by Marta Bellan)
 "Jeszcze sen" - 2:15 (music Czesław Niemen, lyrics Marta Bellan)
 "Jeżeli" - 3:20 (music Czesław Niemen, lyrics Julian Tuwim)
 "Domek bez adresu" - 2:25 (music Andrzej Korzyński, lyrics Andrzej Tylczyński)
 "Dziwny jest ten świat" - 3:35 (music Czesław Niemen, lyrics Czesław Niemen)

1979 greatest hits albums
Czesław Niemen compilation albums